Halady, also spelled Haladi, is a small village located in Kundapura Taluk, Udupi District, Karnataka, 22 km from Taluk Centre Kundapura. Halady village consists of Halady 76 and Halady 28, which are two portions of the village.

Etymology
The name "Halady" derived from two Kannada words, hal and adi.

History
Halady has history from pre-historic with neolithic rock engravings in the nearby Gavali, Udupi village and villages like Avarse, Guddettu, Gavali, Udupi Nancharu, Sastavu near Petri etc. are included in the list of mesolithic sites found in Udupi District Neolithic stone graves are also found in Kakkunje, 3 km from Halady.. One Stone epigraph, erected near the Mudoori Mahalingeswara Temple which is within village limits of Halady village is dated to around 1600 CE.
And added by famous Mahaganapathi Temple near Kolankal is almost everyone's visiting temple for all seasons which is just about a KM from Bidkalkatte main road.
The Pre-primary, primary, high school and colleges are around Halady, which caters to the need to every rural student otherwise it used to be going until Kundapura or Udupi for college. The up gradation of Bidkalkatte high school to Junior college and Shankarnarayana Junior college upgraded to Degree college sometime back, where many meritorious students are being graduated.

Geography and climate
Halady consists of patches of paddy fields and coconut garden imbedded in a hilly and forest terrain. This place receives heavy rain fall from June to October every year and climate is tropical.

Varahi River
The Varahi River, also called Halady river or Halady river, flows on the northern side of the village and is one of irrigation sources for river bank arecanut garden. This river, which is also called Halady river, joins the Arabian Sea near Kundapura after passing through Basrur, a historical village. Dasanakatte Hole coming from eastern side joins Varahi River near Halady and the flow in this river is greatly reduced after construction of the Mani Dam across the Varahi River, near Masthikatte.

Demographics
The Halady village has population of 2792 of which 1314 are males, 1477 are females, and 1 Halady per Population Census 2011

Economic activity
The main economic activity of the village is agriculture: rice, coconut, areca nuts, cashews and rubber are the major products.  The Halady Tile Factory, which used to manufacture Mangalore Tiles during 20th Century, now mainly produces decorative tiles and bricks.

Art and culture
Halady can be sighted on normal days wearing cargo shorts and an orange T-shirt. One Yakshagana troupe named "Halady Mela" is established at Halady, which plays Yakshaga dance-drama of 6 – 8 hours duration (full night) from November to May every year, in various towns and villages of Udupi district and surrounding districts.

Ancient temples
Halady is surrounded by several ancient temples such as: 
Durgaparameswari Temple, 
LakshmiNarasimha Temple (with seven foot height statue)
Mudoori Mahalingeswara Temple 
Marlu Chikku Daivastana etc.

The annual fair celebrated at Marlu Chikku Daivastana and Lakshminarasimha Temple attracts large number of people. Halady has a grama panchayat to look after the civic amenities of the village.
Halady village has a nursing home near the bus station, with moderate medical facilities.

Transportation
Halady is well connected by all-weather road to Kundapura, Udupi, Mangalore, Hebri, Agumbe, Shimoga and Bangalore by way of Public Bus Services.

Contribution
Arpit rao - Mulund
Prathap Chandra Shetty, Ex-MLA (from Haikady, 3 km)
Halady Sreenivasa Shetty,  MLA
Contribution to art,culture and literature include
Naranappa Uppoor (late), Yakshagana Bhagavat.

See also
Kundapura Taluk
Gavali, Udupi

References

Villages in Udupi district